The Australian Youth Orchestra (AYO), formerly Youth Music Australia, is an Australian organisation for young musicians.

History
The Australian Youth Orchestra has its origins in the music camps founded by John Bishop and Ruth Alexander in 1948. These camps saw the foundation of the National Music Camp Association (NCMA) in 1951. The Youth Orchestra itself debuted in 1957 at the Sydney Town Hall.  

The organisation changed its name to Youth Music Australia in 1993 before adopting the name of its flagship in 2000.

Description
AYO operates the national youth orchestra of Australia, as well as Camerata Australia, Young Australian Concert Artists and Young Symphonists. It also runs several other activities including master classes, outreach programmes and a generous scholarship scheme.  

The Australian Youth Orchestra is one of eight "national elite training organisations" of the "Australian Roundtable for Arts Training Excellence" (ARTS8), partially funded by the Australian Government via the Office for the Arts.

Awards and nominations

APRA Classical Music Awards
The APRA Classical Music Awards are presented annually by Australasian Performing Right Association (APRA) and Australian Music Centre (AMC).

|-
|rowspan="2"| 2007 || Body Torque – The Australian Ballet, Australian Youth Orchestra, Sonic Art Ensemble || Outstanding Contribution by an Organisation || 
|-
|2006 National Music Camp Composition Program, Body Torque – Australian Youth Orchestra, The Australian Ballet || Outstanding Contribution to Australian Music in Education ||

ARIA Music Awards
The ARIA Music Awards is an annual awards ceremony that recognises excellence, innovation, and achievement across all genres of Australian music. They commenced in 1987. 

! 
|-
| 1989
| Australia Day / Child of Australia (with Sydney Symphony Orchestra, Joan Carden & John Howard)
|rowspan="2" |Best Classical Album
| 
|rowspan="2" | 
|-
| 1990
| Works of Koehne, Stravinsky, Messiaen, Ravel
| 
|-

References

Music education organizations
APRA Award winners
Australian youth orchestras
Music schools in Australia
National youth orchestras